Miranda (formerly Parque del Este) is a Caracas Metro station on Line 1. It was opened on 23 April 1988 as part of the extension of Line 1 from Chacaíto to Los Dos Caminos. The station is between Altamira and Los Dos Caminos.

The station was renamed in 2008 to honor the Venezuelan national hero Francisco de Miranda.

References

Caracas Metro stations
1988 establishments in Venezuela
Railway stations opened in 1988